Anvil is an unincorporated community in Gogebic County, Michigan, United States.

Notes

Unincorporated communities in Gogebic County, Michigan
Unincorporated communities in Michigan